Armen T. Marsoobian is an academic. He holds a chair in the philosophy department at Southern Connecticut State University. Marsoobian was awarded the Hrant Dink Foundation Prize for Historical Research for studies on the Armenian genocide.

References

Living people
Year of birth missing (living people)
Southern Connecticut State University faculty
Historians of the Armenian genocide
Place of birth missing (living people)